The National Progressive Fraction was a parliamentary group in the Indonesian People's Representative Council, formed after the 1955 parliamentary election. The group consisted of ten Members of Parliament, all elected from Java.

Members;
Murba Party
Acoma Party
Permai
Baperki
National People's Party
PIR-Wongsonegoro
Gerinda
R. Soedjono Prawirosudarso (independent)

References

Defunct political parties in Indonesia
Defunct political party alliances in Asia
Liberal democracy period in Indonesia
Parliamentary groups
Political parties with year of disestablishment missing
Political parties with year of establishment missing
Political party alliances in Indonesia